MMAS may refer to:

 Lic. Jesús Terán Peredo International Airport, airport in Mexico with ICAO code MMAS
Master of Military Art and Science, degree awarded by the U.S. School of Advanced Military Studies
Master of Mobile Application Security, see List of professional designations in the United States
 Matt Morgan Appreciation Society, fan club of wrestler Matt Morgan
 Make Me a Supermodel (Australian TV series)
Morisky Medication Adherence Scale, a method for assessing patient medication adherence in clinical research
 Max-Min Ant System, a type of Ant colony optimization algorithm, see Ant colony optimization algorithms#Max-Min Ant System (MMAS)

See also

MMA (disambiguation), for the singular of MMAs
MAS (disambiguation)